Sergio Jaramillo (born 22 June 1958) is a Colombian former professional racing cyclist. He rode in the 1986 Tour de France.

References

External links

1958 births
Living people
Colombian male cyclists
People from Medellín